Luigi Bienaimé (Carrara, 1795–1878) was a sculptor active in Italy during the Neoclassical period.

His family originally was from Belgium, however, he gained a stipend from Carrara to study sculpture in Rome, where he studied in the studio of Thorvaldsen. There he worked alongside Pietro Tenerani, Emilio Volff, and Pietro Galli.

Bienaimé was commissioned a number of works by the Russian court in St Peterburg, including a Marriage for the Czar, a Bacchante dancing, a Diana surprised, and a Psyche abandoned by Love. He was also prolific with portraits, including the Czar, Napoleon, and Washington. He completed sculptures for Prince Torlonia and Prince Gallitzin. He became professor of sculpture in the Accademia di San Luca.

Sources

1795 births
1878 deaths
People from Carrara
19th-century Italian sculptors
Italian male sculptors
Neoclassical sculptors
Italian people of Belgian descent
19th-century Italian male artists